Korsnes Church is a parish church of the Church of Norway in Hamarøy Municipality in Nordland county, Norway. It is located in the village of Korsnes. It is the church for the Korsnes parish which is part of the Ofoten prosti (deanery) in the Diocese of Sør-Hålogaland. The white, wooden church was built in a long church style in 1888 using plans drawn up by the architect Sigmund Brænne. The church seats about 80 people.

History
The first church in Korsnes was built in 1888, but it was from reused materials. The materials were originally used in 1720 to build a chapel in Kjøpsnes (near where Kjøpsvik Church is now located). The chapel was later taken down and rebuilt on the island of Hulløya in 1791. In 1838, the building was moved back to Kjøpsnes where it was enlarged. In 1885, the parish decided to build a new Kjøpsvik Church. So in 1888, the church was taken down and moved to Korsnes where it was rebuilt as Korsnes Church. It was put into use in 1888, but it was not formally consecrated until 6 May 1889.

Media gallery

See also
List of churches in Sør-Hålogaland

References

Hamarøy
Churches in Nordland
Wooden churches in Norway
19th-century Church of Norway church buildings
Churches completed in 1888
1888 establishments in Norway
Long churches in Norway